Zuker is a surname. Notable people with the surname include:

Charles Zuker, American biologist
Danny Zuker (born  1964), American writer and producer

See also
Zucker (disambiguation)
Anthony E. Zuiker (born 1968), American television writer, television producer, and author